Morocco competed at the 1972 Summer Olympics in Munich, West Germany.

Results by event

Athletics
Men's 800 metres
M'Hamad Amakdouf
 Heat — DNS (→ did not advance)

Men's 1500 metres
M'Hamad Amakdouf
 Heat — 3:48.4 (→ did not advance)

Men's 5000 metres
Jadour Haddou
 Heat — DNS (→ did not advance)

Boxing
Men's Flyweight (– 51 kg)
 Ali Ouabbou

 First Round — Bye 
 Second Round — Lost to Chris Ius (CAN), 2:3

Football

Men's Team Competition
First Round (Group A)
 Drew with the United States (0-0)
 Lost to West Germany (0-3)
 Defeated Malaysia (6-0)
Second Round (Group 2)
 Lost to the Soviet Union (0-3)
 Lost to Denmark (1-3)
 Lost to Poland (0-5) → did not advance, 8th place over-all

Team Roster

 Mohamed Hazzaz
 Ahmed Belkorchi
 Boujemaâ Benkhrif
 Khalifa Elbakhti
 Mohamed Elfilali
 Ahmed Faras
 Abdelmajid Hadry
 Mohamed Hazzaz
 Larbi Ihardane
 Abdelfattah Jafri
 Abdellah Lamrani
 Mohamed Merzaq
 Ahmed Tati Mohamed
 Ghazouani Mouhoub
 Ahmed Najah
 Abdallah Tazi
 Mustapha Yaghcha
 Abdelali Zahraoui

References
Official Olympic Reports

Nations at the 1972 Summer Olympics
1972 Summer Olympics
1972 in Moroccan sport